Take to the Skies is the debut studio album by British rock band Enter Shikari. It is the first album to achieve a significant chart success for a new act operating outside the traditional label system after selling 200,000 copies worldwide.

Background and recording
Following the demise of Hybryd, Enter Shikari was formed with Rou Reynolds on vocals, Rory Clewlow on guitar, Chris Batten on bass, and Rob Rolfe on drums. In 2003 and 2004, the group self-released three EPs – Nodding Acquaintance (2003), Sorry You're Not a Winner (2004) and Anything Can Happen in the Next Half Hour (2004) – that they sold at shows and used to help grow their fan base. With an increasing touring schedule, the group began using social networking platform Myspace. In August, the band posted a demo version of "Labyrinth", followed by a demo of "OK, Time for Plan B" in September. In mid-2006, the group established their own record label, Ambush Reality, and digitally released the "Mothership" single. Between July and October 2006, the band embarked on their first headlining tour of the United Kingdom. Recording sessions for Take to the Skies took place at The Outhouse in Reading with John Mitchell and Ben Humphreys. The group, Joel De'ath, Ben Shute, Ian Shortshaft and Tim Boardman contributed gang vocals. The group produced the sessions and Martin Giles mastered the recordings at Alchemy Soho in London.

The album contains re-recorded versions of many songs that were featured on demos, singles and EPs released in the years prior to their debut. "Sorry You're Not A Winner" was first on the band's second EP Sorry You're Not A Winner EP in 2003. It was later re-recorded in 2006 along with "OK, Time For Plan B" (which was a previously released demo in 2005) for the band's second single "Sorry You're Not a Winner"/"OK Time for Plan B". "Jonny Sniper" and "Anything Can Happen In The Next Half Hour..." were both on the band's third EP Anything Can Happen in the Next Half Hour in 2004; they were completely re-recorded for the album. A demo version of "Mothership" was previously released for the band's first single in 2006. Also "Enter Shikari", "Labyrinth", and "Return to Energiser" were released as demos from 2005-06.

Release
Take to the Skies was released on 19 March 2007. On the album's track listing, tracks 1, 5, 9, 11, 13 and 17 are untitled. However, the untitled tracks have been given names on the digital versions and other retailer descriptions. Track 1 is universally titled "Stand Your Ground; This Is Ancient Land". In most cases tracks 5, 9, 11, 13 and 17 are all titled "Interlude", sometimes being numbered. However, on the iTunes track listing 9 and 17 are both titled Reprise One and Two, respectively. Also, Track 17 is sometimes titled "Closing".

In early June, the group performed at Download Festival. "Jonny Sniper" was released as a single on 18 June. In early August, the group headlined Kerrang! Day of Rock event. To promote the Kerrang! Awards, the group played a one-off show in London in late August. After the release of the album in Europe, the band spent a long period of time finding a distributor, which they would need to release the album in North America. Finally they signed to Tiny Evil Records and the album was released on October 30. It has been released as a CD, a CD+DVD edition and vinyl version with an embossed gatefold sleeve. They ended the year with a short West Coast US tour.

On July 18, 2013, the band announced a repressing of the vinyl on a new colourway (green and beige), limited to just 500 copies, coming with a signed artwork print, for official release on August 5. The pressing was down to fans paying high prices on auction sites for original copies, and it sold out within a few hours of going on sale.

Reception

On March 25, 2007, it reached #4 in the Official UK Album Chart selling 28,000 copies in its first week. The album reached worldwide sales of 200,000 copies and was certified Gold in the UK after selling over 100,000 copies. It is also the first album to achieve a significant chart success for a new act operating outside the traditional label system.

Track listing
All lyrics by Rou Reynolds, all music by Enter Shikari.

Charts and certifications

Weekly charts

Year-end charts

Certifications

Personnel
Personnel per booklet.

Enter Shikari
Rou Reynolds – lead vocals, electronics, lap steel guitar
Chris Batten – bass, co-vocals
Rory Clewlow – lead guitar, backing vocals
Rob Rolfe – drums

Additional musicians
Enter Shikari – gang vocals
Joel De'ath – gang vocals
Ben Shute – gang vocals
Ian Shortshaft – gang vocals
Tim Boardman – gang vocals

Production
Enter Shikari – producer
John Mitchell – recording
Ben Humphreys – recording
Martin Giles – mastering
Peter Hill – photo
Keaton Henson – illustration, design

References

External links

Take to the Skies at YouTube (streamed copy where licensed)

Self-released albums
Ambush Reality albums
Enter Shikari albums
2007 debut albums
Trance albums